This is a listing of all the commissioners and club presidents of the VFL/AFL.

An independent VFL Commission was formed in 1985, being renamed the AFL Commission in 1990 in line with the competition.

In 1993, the AFL Commission was given the power to make most administrative decisions relating to the league unilaterally, with the AFL Board of Directors voting itself out of existence. In 1995, the AFL Commission would also assume control of the administration of Australian rules football when it absorbed the ANFC.

A separate role of AFL Chairman was created in 1993 (see below).

VFL President (1897–1985), VFL/AFL Chairman/Chief Executive Officer (since 1985)

AFL Chairman (since 1993)

Club Presidents

Adelaide
 Bob Hammond (1991-2000) 
 Bob Campbell (2001-2003)
 Bill Sanders (2004–2008)
 Rob Chapman (2009–2020)
 John Olsen (2021–present)

Brisbane Bears/Lions
 Paul Cronin (1987–1990)
 Noel Gordon (1990–1999)
 Alan Piper (1999–2000)
 Graeme Downie (2000–2006)
 Tony Kelly (2006–2010)
 Angus Johnson (2010–2013)
 Bob Sharpless (2013–2017)
 Andrew Wellington (2017–present)

Carlton
 Robert McFarland (1864–1865) 
 James Linacre (1865)
 George Coppin (1866–1872)
 John Walls (1873)
 Robert Robertson (1874–1885)
 Arthur Gillespie (1886–1894)
 Frederick Bromley (1895)
 A. H. Shaw (1896–1901)
 Robert Heatley (1901–1904)
 H. B. Higgins (1904–1905)
 W. F. Evans (1905–1907)
 J. Urquhart (1907–1910)
 J. McInerney (1910–1912)
 D. Bell (1912–1914)
 Jack Gardiner (1914–1925)
 D. Young (1925–1928)
 Dave Crone (1929–1938)
 Sir Kenneth Luke (1938–1956)
 Horrie Clover (1956–1958)
 L. J. M. Holmes (1958–1965)
 George Harris (1965–1975, 1978–1980)
 Ivan Rohrt (1975–1978)
 Ian Rice (1980–1983)
 John Elliott (1983–2002)
 Ian Collins (2002–2006)
 Graham Smorgon (2006–2007)
 Stephen Kernahan (2007)
 Richard Pratt (2007–2008)
 Stephen Kernahan (2008–2014)
 Mark LoGiudice (2014–2021)
 Luke Sayers (2021–present)

Collingwood

 William Beazley (1892–1911)
 Alfred Cross (1912)
 Jim Sharp (1913–1923)
 Harry Curtis (1924–1950)
 Syd Coventry (1950–1962)
 Tom Sherrin (1963–1974)
 Ern Clarke (1975–1976)
 John Hickey (1977–1981)
 Ranald Macdonald (1982–1986)
 Allan McAllister (1986–1995)
 Kevin Rose (1996–1998)
 Eddie McGuire (1998–2021)
 Mark Korda (2021)
 Jeff Browne (2021-present)

Essendon
 Robert McCracken (1877–1885)
 James Robertson (1886)
 Alexander McCracken (1887–1903)
 W. Kent-Hughes (1904–1907)
 A. L. Crichton (1908–1919)
 W. Raper (1920–1925)
 A. F. McGowan (1926–1929)
 F. F. Campbell (1930–1934)
 A. F. Showers (1935–1940)
 N. H. Mirams (1940)
 W. R. Crichton (1941–1959)
 W. G. Brew (1959–1968)
 Allan Hird Snr (1969–1975)
 Colin Stubbs (1976–1980)
 Greg Sewell (1981–1987)
 Ron Evans (1988–1992)
 David Shaw (1992–1996)
 Graeme McMahon (1996–2003)
 Neil McKissock (2003–2006)
 Ray Horsburgh (2006–2009)
 David Evans (2009–2013)
 Paul Little (2013–2015)
 Lindsay Tanner (2015–2020)
 Paul Brasher (2020 – 2022)
 David Barham (2022 - present)

Fitzroy
 John McMahon (1884–1887)
 Robert Best (1887–1910)
 Don Chandler (1910–1930)
 Bill Hannah (1930–1932)
 Alec Sloan (1932–1933)
 Ossie Porter (1933–1936)
 Bill Raymond (1936–1938)
 Harold McLennan (1938–1947)
 George Hook (1947–1951)
 Les Phelan (1951–1964)
 Ern Joseph (1964–1975)
 Frank Bibby (1975–1980)
 Keith Wiegard (1980–1984)
 Bruce White (1984–1985)
 Leon Wiegard (1985–1991)
 Dyson Hore-Lacy (1991–1996)

Fremantle
 Ross Kelly (1995–1998, Chairman)
 Ross McLean (1999–2001, Chairman)
 Rick Hart (2002 – 2009, titled Chairman until 2004, President since 2005)
 Steve Harris (2009–2016)
 Dale Alcock (2016 – present)

Geelong
 P. Dwyer (1878) 
 James Wilson Sr (1878–1883)
 J. Hopkins (1884–1885)
 F. Orchard (1886)
 J. Wilson (1887–1888)
 J. Sommers (1889)
 G. W. Steedman (1890)
 J. H. Grey (1891–1899)
 J. McMullen (1900–1902)
 H. B. Hodges (1903–1909)
 A. H. Bowman (1910–1920)
 Brig. Gen. R. Smith (1921–1922)
 Cr W. L. Carr (1922)
 Dr J. E. Piper (1923–1926)
 Cr J. A. Thear (1927–1929)
 M. Jacobs (1930–1938)
 T. B. Hawkes (1939)
 B. N. M. Collins (1940–1945)
 Jack Jennings (1946–1970)
 Vern Johnstone (1971–1973)
 Neil Trezise (1974–1975)
 M. O. Graham (1976–1979)
 J. N. McHolt (1980–1982)
 Dr K. L. C. Threlfall (1983–1987)
 W. Bannon (1987–1988)
 Ron Hovey OAM (1988–1998)
 Frank Costa (1998–2010)
 Colin Carter (2011–2020)
 Craig Drummond (2021–present)

Gold Coast
 John Witheriff (2009–2016)
 Tony Cochrane (2016 – present)

Greater Western Sydney
 Tony Shepherd (2011–present)

Hawthorn
 J. C. Watts (1902)
 George Swinburne (1903)
 C. O. Shave (1906)
 Col. Pleasants (1907)
 W. M. Burton (1908–1909, 1912)
 H. Henningsen (1910)
 Charles Bethune (1911, 1914–1915)
 Cr. Wood (1913)
 W. H. "Bill" Hulse (1916)
 Edward Ward (1919)
 F. O. Small (1920)
 J. "Bill" Kennon (1921–1931) 
 Dr Jacob Jona J.P. (1932–1949)
 David Prentice (1949–1953)
 A. "Sandy" Ferguson (1953–1968)
 Phil Ryan (1968–1980)
 Ron Cook (1980–1988)
 Trevor Coote (1988–1994)
 Geoff Lord (1994–1995)
 Brian Coleman (1995–1996)
 Ian Dicker (1996–2005)
 Jeff Kennett (2005–2011, 2017–2022)
 Andrew Newbold (2011–2016)
 Richard Garvey (2016–2017)
 Andy Gowers (2022–present)

Melbourne

 Frank Grey-Smith (1883–1890) 
 R. H. McLeod (1890–1897)
 H. C. A. Harrison (1897–1906)
 T. F. Morkham (1907–1910)
 A. A. Aitken (1911)
 William C. McClelland (1912–1926)
 Vernon Ransford (1927–1928)
 Joe Blair (1929–1946)
 William Flintoft (1947–1949)
 Albert Chadwick (1950–1962)
 Donald Duffy (1963–1974)
 John Mitchell (1975–1978)
 Wayne Reid (1979–1980)
 Sir Billy Snedden (1981–1986)
 Stuart Spencer (1986–1991)
 Ian Ridley (1991–1996)
 Joseph Gutnick (1996–2002)
 Gabriel Szondy (2002–2003)
 Paul Gardner (2003–2008)
 Jim Stynes (2008–2012)
 Don McLardy (2012–2013)
 Peter Spargo (2013) (Acting)
 Glen Bartlett (2013–2021)
 Kate Roffey (2021–present)

North Melbourne/Kangaroos
 John McIndoe (1869–1871) 
 R. J. Alcock (1872–1873)
 Dr. Burke (1874)
 R. Sutcliffe (1875, 1877–1881)
 E. Harcourt (1882–1885)
 R. K. Montgomerie (1886)
 M. Evans (1887–1891)
 J. Barwise (1892–1895, 1897)
 N. M. O'Donnell (1896)
 D. Wadick (1898)
 W. H. Fuller (1899–1900)
 James Gardiner (1901)
 G. M. Prendergast (1902–1911)
 Clem Davidson (1912–1919)
 T. F. Jenyns (1920)
 B. Deveney (1921)
 George E Ravenhall (1922–1923)
 A. J. Russell (1924)
 Patrick Sullivan (1924–1928)
 Dr D Berman (1928)
 Arthur Calwell (1928–1934)
 Dr D Berman (1934–1937)
 Frank Trainor (1937–1952)
 Johnny Meere (1952–1953)
 Phonse Tobin (1953–1956)
 Alex Marr (1956–1962)
 Jack Adams (1962–1965)
 Tony Trainor (1965–1971)
 Allen Aylett (1971–1977)
 Lloyd Holyoak (1977–1980)
 Al Mantello (1980)
 Bob Ansett (1980–1992)
 Ron Casey (1992–2000)
 Andrew Carter (2000–2001)
 Allen Aylett (2001–2005)
 Graham Duff (2005–2007)
 John Magowan (2007)
 James Brayshaw (2007–2016)
 Ben Buckley (2016–2022)
 Dr Sonja Hood (2022–present)

Port Adelaide
SANFL
 J. Hart Snr (1870–1879)
 J. Formby (1880–1892)
 J. Cleave (1893–1894)
 W. Fisher (1895–900)
 R. Cruickshank (1901)
 W. E. Mattinson (1902–1911)
 R. Cruickshank (1912)
 Dr A. V. Benson (1913–1921)
 S. H. Skipper (1922–1925)
 Dr P. T. S. Cherry (1927–1931, 1937–1949)
 C. T. Gunn (1932–1936)
 Dr W. H. Baudinet (1950–1951)
 F. B. Harvey (1952–1972)
 K. L. Duthie (1973–1985)
 B. H. Weber (1986–1992)

AFL
 Greg Boulton (1993–2008)
 Brett Duncanson (2008–2012)
 David Koch (2013–present)

Richmond
 George Bennett (1887–1908)
 Frank Tudor (1909–1918)
 Alf Wood (1919–1923)
 Jack Archer (1924–1931)
 Barney Herbert (1932–1935, 1939)
 Lou Roberts (1936–1938)
 Harry Dyke (1940–1958)
 Maurie Fleming (1958–1963)
 Ray Dunn (1964–1971)
 Alistair Boord (1971–1973)
 Ian Wilson (1974–1985)
 Barry Richardson (1985)
 Bill Durham (1986)
 Alan Bond (1987)
 Neville Crowe (1987–1993)
 Leon Daphne (1993–1999)
 Clinton Casey (2000–2005)
 Gary March (2005–2013)
 Peggy O'Neal (2013–2022)
 John O'Rourke (2022–present)

St Kilda
 Dave McNamara (1939–1940) 
 E. C. Mitty (1940–1945)
 Reuben Sackville (1946–1955)
 Jack Reilly (1958)
 Graham Huggins (1959–1979)
 Lindsay Fox (1979–1985)
 David Perry (1985–1986)
 Travis Payze (1987–1993)
 Andrew Plympton (1993–2001)
 Rod Butterss (2001–2007)
 Greg Westaway (2007–2013)
 Peter Summers (2013–2018)
 Andrew Bassat (2018–present)

South Melbourne/Sydney
 A. Brown (1881) 
 Henry Dodds (1881–1891)
 A. G. Major (1895, 1898)
 Dr Thomson (1896)
 John Sloss (1897)
 Thomas Craine (1899–1903)
 Henry Hawkins Skinner (1904–1911)
 George A. Emslie (1912–1917)
 Joseph Francis Hannon (1919)
 Robert Melville Cuthbertson (1920–1928)
 Jack Rohan (1929–1932)
 Archie Crofts (1933–1937)
 J. D. M. Dickson (1938–1941)
 Lionel Newton (1942–1945)
 J. P. Cullen (1946–1959)
 W. R. Tait (1960–1963)
 R. C. Warner (1963)
 C. V. Ridgway (1964–1967)
 Brian Bourke (1967–1972)
 S. Keane (1972–1973)
 K. G. Hooker (1974–1975)
 Craig Kimberley (1976–1977, 1986–1988)
 G. Camakaris (1977–1978)
 Graeme John (1978–1981)
 Jack Marks (1981–1985)
 Dr Geoffrey Edelsten (1985–1986)
 Peter Weinert (1988–1993)
 Richard Colless (1993–2013)
 Andrew Pridham (2013 – present)

Footscray/Western Bulldogs
 David Mitchell (1886–1893) 
 James Tucker (1893–1894)
 James Cuming (1894–1911)
 Frank Shillabeer (1911–1912)
 Arch Crow (1912–1921)
 George Sayer (1922, 1926)
 James Stephens (1923)
 George Farnsworth (1924)
 L. Caldecott (1925)
 Kevin McCarthy (1926–1938)
 Bert Jamieson (1938–1941)
 Con Curtain (1941–1946)
 Otto Grobbecker (1946–1949, 1953–1955)
 Con Weickhardt (1949–1952)
 Bernie Barry (1955–1960)
 Harry Dolphin (1960–1962)
 Jim Miller (1962–1966)
 Jack Collins (1966–1973)
 Dick Collinson (1973–1978)
 Charlie Sutton (1979–1981)
 G. Gray (1981–1981)
 Tony Capes (1982–1988)
 Barry Beattie (1988–1989)
 Nick Columb (1989–1989)
 Peter Gordon (1989–1996, 2013–2020)
 David Smorgon (1996–2012)
 Kylie Watson-Wheeler (2021-present)

West Coast
 Richard Colless (1987)
 Neil Hamilton (1987–89)
 Terry O'Connor (1989–92)
 Dwane Buckland (1992–96)
 Murray McHenry (1996–98)
 Michael Smith (1998–2002)
 Dalton Gooding (2002–2007)
 Mark Barnaba (2007–10)
 Alan Cransberg (2010–2016)
 Russell Gibbs (2016–present)

References

Presidents